The only recorded ship visit is a 3-day visit to Hauraki (the Waihou River between the Hauraki Plains and Coromandel Peninsula) to collect timber. It is possible that sealers visit Dusky Sound and that whalers are off the north-east coast but no specific records of any such activity remains.

Events
 March: HMS Reliance, Captain Henry Waterhouse, discovers and charts the Antipodes Islands.
11 May: The Betsey, Captain John Myers, leaves Port Jackson for Peru. En route she visits Hauraki for three days to collect timber. On board are two pākehā women, the first to visit the North Island.

Undated
Samuel Marsden becomes the principal, and at the time only remaining, chaplain for New South Wales.

Births
 18 July (in England): William Williams, first Bishop of Waiapu.
1 October (in England): James Reddy Clendon, settler and public official (died 1872)
approximate
c.1800 (in England): John Guard, whaler and trader, first permanent European resident in the South Island.

Deaths

See also
List of years in New Zealand
Timeline of New Zealand history
History of New Zealand
Military history of New Zealand
Timeline of the New Zealand environment
Timeline of New Zealand's links with Antarctica

References